The 2011 Asian Qualification Tournament for London Olympic Games was held in Bangkok, Thailand from November 26 to November 27, 2011. Each country may enter maximum 2 male and 2 female divisions with only one in each division and the first three ranked athletes per weight division qualify their NOCs a place each for Olympic
Games.

Medalists

Men

Women

Qualification summary

Results

Men

−58 kg
27 November

−68 kg
26 November

−80 kg
26 November

+80 kg
27 November

Women

−49 kg
26 November

−57 kg
27 November

−67 kg
27 November

+67 kg
26 November

References

 Results November 26, 2011
 Results November 27, 2011

External links
 World Taekwondo Federation

Olympic Qualification
Taekwondo Olympic Qual
Taekwondo Olympic Qual
Asian